The 2003–04 Sevens World Series was the fifth edition of the global circuit for men's national rugby sevens teams, organised by the International Rugby Board. The series was held over eight tournaments, an increase of one over the previous year. This was the first year that the USA Sevens was added to the series. New Zealand won its fifth consecutive series, narrowly defeating England.

Calendar

Final standings
The points awarded to teams at each event, as well as the overall season totals, are shown in the table below. Points for the event winners are indicated in bold. A zero (0) is recorded in the event column where a team played in a tournament but did not gain any points. A dash (–) is recorded in the event column if a team did not compete at a tournament.

Source: rugby7.com (archived)

Notes:
 South Africa won the 2003 Dubai Sevens and lost in the Cup Semi-Finals at the 2003 South Africa Sevens but no points are indicated on the IRB Series Standings for 2003-04. South Africa were deducted their points for these rounds for fielding an ineligible player (Tonderai Chavhanga).

External links

References

 
World Rugby Sevens Series